Aspisoma is a genus of fireflies in the family Lampyridae. There are at least 70 described species in Aspisoma.

Species
These 71 species belong to the genus Aspisoma:

References

Further reading

 
 
 
 
 
 
 
 

Lampyridae
Lampyridae genera
Bioluminescent insects
Articles created by Qbugbot